Runyararo Mapfumo is a British television director, film director, writer, and producer. She is known for her work on the critically acclaimed Netflix television series Sex Education.

Background
In 2013, Mapfumo graduated from Sheffield Hallam University with a first class honours degree in film and visual effects.

Career
Mapfumo has received funding from the British Film Institute, the BBC, and Google Arts. She has featured in the BFI London Film Festival. Her third short, Masterpiece, was shown at the 2020 We Are One: A Global Film Festival. In 2021, she was listed as number 5 in TechRound's "Top 50 BAME Entrepreneurs Under 50".

Filmography

Director
Sex Education (2021) - TV series
What's in a Name? (2020) - short
The Uncertain Kingdom (2020) - documentary
Dawn in the Dark (2019) - short
Sensational Simmy! (2019) - short
Masterpiece (2017) - short
The Time Is Now (2015) - short
Revelation (2013) - short

References

External links 

Living people
Year of birth missing (living people)
Alumni of Sheffield Hallam University
British television directors
British women film directors